Spanish viceroys of the colonial  Viceroyalty of New Granada (1717–1819) located in northern South America.

Introduction
The former territory within the Viceroyalty of New Granada corresponds to present day Colombia, Ecuador, Panama, and Venezuela. It also encompassed areas of present-day Guyana, southwestern Suriname, northwestern Brazil, northern Peru, Costa Rica, and Nicaragua.

From the initial Spanish colonization of northern South American in the 1540s to the Viceroyalty of New Granada's establishment in 1718, the territories were governed by the Viceroyalty of Peru (1542–1824). They included the included smaller colonial Audiencia Real of Bogotá and New Kingdom of Granada. In 1777 the provinces of Venezuela were assigned to the new colonial Captaincy General of Venezuela (1777–1821), governed by Captains General.

The territories of the viceroyalty gained independence from Spain between 1819 and 1822 after a series of military and political struggles, uniting in the republic of Gran Colombia (1821–1831).

Viceroys

*Acting viceroy (without the formal title).

**In 1723, the Viceroyalty was dissolved. Its government returned to the Presidency of the New Kingdom of Granada, part of the Viceroyalty of Peru, until the reestablishment of the separate viceroyalty in 1739.

***He was named to the post but did not formally occupy it.

See also 
 
 
 History of Colombia

 List
.V, List

Colonial Colombia
Colombia history-related lists
Viceroys
Spanish colonial governors and administrators
18th-century Colombian people
19th-century Colombian people
South American monarchs
Viceroys of New Granada
Viceroys of New Granada
Viceroys of New Granada